Ah Xian (born 1960) is a Chinese-born artist based in Sydney, Australia.

Early life

Ah Xian was born in Beijing, China, in 1960. While both of Xian's parents worked at universities, Xian worked as a mechanical fitter and in a factory. Xian taught himself how to paint, though at one point was jailed overnight by the Chinese Communist Party for producing nude paintings.

In 1989, Xian travelled to Australia to visit the University of Tasmania. He briefly returned to Beijing, but did not stay as the Tiananmen Square massacre on 4 June motivated him to leave China. After leaving China, he applied for asylum in Australia. Though his application was initially rejected in 1989, he was granted residency in Australia in 1995.

Art exhibitions

Metaphysica (2007). Metaphysica includes a series of bronze busts. Each bust is different from the rest in that there is a different object on the head of each bust. Xian chose the objects individually as each of them referenced Chinese mythological or historical belief systems.
Concrete Forrest (2009). Concrete Forrest depicts a series of 36 busts in concrete rather than in porcelain, like in China China. Each bust has its own feature of vegetation from the local area surrounding Jingdezhen.
Human, Human (2000). Human Human depicts a full body porcelain casting, featuring a woman with an almost scaley-like green print across her body, with blooming flowers and plants travelling upwards from her feet to her head.
China, China (1999). China China features a series of 40 hand painted porcelain busts, as well as several pairs of legs. Xian used the faces of his family and friends to create the busts, and then employed local painters in Jingdezhen, China, to paint the busts by hand. The porcelain busts feature muted expressions as well as traditional Chinese symbols, such as flowers and dragons.
Evolutionaura (2013). Evolutionaura features a series of 8 busts, similar to Xian's other art installations. In Evolutionaura, the busts are composed of metallic materials, such as bronze, and speckled in minerals from the Lingbi County in Anhui Province of China.
Naturephysica (2016). Similar to Metaphysica, Naturephysica features a series of busts with objects on the heads of the busts. However, Naturephysica differs from Metaphysica in that instead of featuring objects that reference Chinese mythology or belief systems, Naturephysica features more natural objects, such as plants and animals, on the tops of the heads of the busts.

Other exhibitions

Ah Xian has held several other art installations aside from the ones mentioned above.
Ah Xian, Herbert-Gerisch-Stiftung, Neumünster, Germany (2009)
Ah Xian, Gemeentemuseum, the Hague, the Netherlands (2008)
Ah Xian, Queensland Art Gallery, Gallery of Modern Art, Brisbane (2003)
The Art of Ah Xian, Asia Society Museum, New York, United States (2002)

Group exhibitions

In addition to holding many of his own installations, Xian has also participated in a series of group installations with other artists as well.
In and Out of Context: Asia Society celebrates the Collections at 60, Asia Society Museum, New York (2016)
Dark Heart, 2014 Adelaide Biennial of Australian Art, Art Gallery of South Australia, Adelaide (2014)
4A A4 4A, 4A Centre for Contemporary Asian Art, Sydney (2013)
Three Decades: The Contemporary Chinese Collection, Queensland Art Gallery, Gallery of Modern Art, Brisbane (1999)
Above and Beyond: Austral/Asian Interactions, 1989, Australian Centre for Contemporary Art, Melbourne, (1996)
Mao Goes Pop: China Post 1989, Museum of Contemporary Art Australia, Sydney, (1993)
Chinese New Wave, CAST at Arthouse, Launceston, Victoria (1992)

Awards and honours

 In 2001, he won the National Gallery of Australia's inaugural National Sculpture Prize.
 In 2009, he won the final Clemenger Contemporary Art Award from the National Gallery of Victoria.  He was awarded the prize of $50,000 for his work, Concrete forest.
 In 2014 Ah Xian was included in the 2014Adelaide Biennial of Australian Art: Dark Heart curated by Nick Mitzevich, Director of the Art Gallery of South Australia.

References

Further reading
 

1960 births
Living people
Artists from Beijing
Chinese sculptors
20th-century Chinese sculptors
20th-century Australian sculptors
21st-century Australian sculptors
Chinese emigrants to Australia